The 1975 Dwars door België was the 30th edition of the Dwars door Vlaanderen cycle race and was held on 23 March 1975. The race started and finished in Waregem. The race was won by Cees Priem.

General classification

References

1975
1975 in road cycling
1975 in Belgian sport